Love Before Breakfast is a 1936 American romantic comedy starring Carole Lombard, Preston Foster, and Cesar Romero, based on Faith Baldwin's short story Spinster Dinner, published in International-Cosmopolitan in July 1934. The film was directed by Walter Lang from a screenplay by Herbert Fields assisted by numerous contract writers, including Preston Sturges.

Plot
Kay Colby (Carole Lombard) is a Park Avenue beauty with two suitors: fiancé Bill Wadsworth (Cesar Romero) and Scott Miller (Preston Foster).  To clear his way, Scott buys the oil company Bill works for and sends him to Japan.  Then he sends his own girl friend, Countess Campanella (Betty Lawford), to Honolulu to get her out of the way as well.  Kay is upset by Bill's leaving, and annoyed by Scott pressing his suit, but Scott has the assistance and approval of Kay's mother (Janet Beecher) in his efforts, and the advice of his friend and business partner, Brinkerhoff (Richard Carle).

Cast

 Carole Lombard as Kay Colby
 Preston Foster as Scott Miller
 Cesar Romero as Bill Wadsworth
 Janet Beecher as Mrs. Colby
 Betty Lawford as Countess Campanella
 Richard Carle as Brinkerhoff
 Forrester Harvey as chief steward
 Joyce Compton as Mary Lee
 Bert Roach as Party Host
 Diana Gibson as the secretary
 John Rogers as Dickson
 Donald Briggs as 	Stuart Farnum
 George Beranger as Charles 
 Jack Mower as Doorman
 Alphonse Martell as 	Headwaiter at Dubin's 
 Dennis O'Keefe as 	College Boy 
 Ada Mae Vaughn as 	College Girl 
 Theodore von Eltz as 	Clerk 
 E.E. Clive as Yacht Captain
 Edward Earle as 	Quartermaster

Production
Love Before Breakfast had the working title of Spinster Dinner, the title of the Faith Baldwin short story it was based on.  Several months before filming began, it was reported that Melvyn Douglas would take the male lead.

Carole Lombard was under contract to Paramount, who lent her to Universal for this film, in exchange for Margaret Sullavan going there to do So Red The Rose. Lombard also brought technical staff from Paramount, including photographer Ted Tetzlaff and costume designer Travis Banton.

Lombard, who had the contractual right to reject scripts, did not like the ones she was presented for Love Before Breakfast, including those written by Preston Sturges, Claude Binyon, Samuel Hoffenstein, Harry Clork, Doris Malloy and William Conselman. Eventually, she accepted Herbert Fields's script.

Love Before Breakfast was in production from 16 December 1935 to 27 January 1936, and was released on 9 March 1936.

References

External links 
 
 
 

1936 films
1936 romantic comedy films
1930s screwball comedy films
American romantic comedy films
American screwball comedy films
American black-and-white films
Films scored by Franz Waxman
Films based on short fiction
Films directed by Walter Lang
Universal Pictures films
Films based on works by Faith Baldwin
1930s English-language films
1930s American films